Leicester City Council is a unitary authority responsible for local government in the city of Leicester, England.  It consists of 54 councillors, representing 22 wards in the city, overseen by a directly elected mayor.  It is currently controlled by the Labour Party and has been led by Mayor Sir Peter Soulsby since his election on 6 May 2011. The main council building is City Hall on Charles Street, but council meetings are held in the 19th-century Town Hall.

As a unitary authority, the council is responsible for running nearly all local services in Leicester with the exception of the Leicestershire Fire and Rescue Service and Leicestershire Constabulary which are run by joint boards with Leicestershire County Council and Rutland County Council.

History

The Council traces its roots to the Corporation of Leicester, and before then to the Merchant Gild and the Portmanmoot. The Portmanmoot consisted of 24 Jurats, elected from the burgesses (members of the Gild Merchant, or freemen), along with two bailiffs, and a clerk. It appears to have existed before the Norman Conquest in 1066. In 1209, the lead member of the Portmanmoot, the Alderman, became known as a mayor. The Gild Merchant and the Moot overlapped in membership and had probably become effectively merged in the 14th century. Membership of the Twenty-Four appears to have been by co-option, chosen by themselves.

Traditionally, the general populace attended some meetings of the Moot and Guild, but this was restricted to burgesses in 1467. Later, in 1489, this changed to a system where the Mayor and the Twenty-Four chose Forty-Eight burgesses to represent the others, and the Twenty-Four and the Forty-Eight would govern jointly.

After doubts as to the ability of the Moot and Gild to hold property arose in the 16th century, the Corporation was formed, replacing the Gild and Portmanmoot, in 1589.  A second charter was granted in 1599, reconfirming this, to The Mayor, Bailiffs and Burgesses of the Borough of Leicester.  The 24 Jurats became known as the Aldermen of the Corporation, and the 48 other Burgesses as the Common Council.  The members of the Corporation chose the burgesses to send to the House of Commons.

The Corporation, as with most English municipal corporations, continued effectively unreformed until the Municipal Reform Act of 1835, although the freemen in general obtained the right to participate in the election of MPs after the Restoration.  The Municipal Reform Act replaced the existing system of co-option for members of the council with elections by rate-payers.  This led to a prolonged spell of Liberal control of the council.

Leicester became, in 1889, under the Local Government Act, a county borough.  The Corporation was replaced in 1974 under the Local Government Act 1972, with the modern Leicester City Council, a non-metropolitan district council under Leicestershire County Council.  Leicestershire County Council's jurisdiction over the City of Leicester was transferred to the City Council on 1 April 1997, making it a unitary authority, as part of the 1990s UK local government reform.

Lord Mayor

The position of Lord Mayor of Leicester is mainly a ceremonial post, and is combined with that of chairman of the council. The position is elected yearly by members of the council and rotates.

Wards
The City is divided into 21 electoral wards, each of which returns two or three councillors, using the bloc voting system, as follows:

A new set of wards and ward boundaries came into effect for the 7 May 2015 council elections. Wards that previously existed and were abolished are Charnwood, Coleman, Freeman, Latimer, New Parks and Western Park.

The previous ward boundaries were adopted for the 2003 local elections. Prior to this, there had been 28 wards, each electing 2 members. Wards that had existed and been abolished were Crown Hills, East Knighton, Mowmacre, North Braunstone, Rowley Fields, Saffron, St Augustine's, West Humberstone, West Knighton and Wycliffe.

Political control

The current composition of the council is as follows:

In December 2010 the council voted to introduce a directly elected mayor with effect from May 2011. Sir Peter Soulsby was elected to the post with 55% of the vote on the first ballot. He was re-elected in May 2015 and 2019 to serve four-year terms.

The next election is due to take place in May 2023, although by-elections take place when a seat becomes vacant due to resignation or death of a councillor.

Arms

Notes

References

External links
Leicester City Council
Leicester Corporation History
Council Ward Maps
Census Ward Profiles

Leicester
Unitary authority councils of England
Mayor and cabinet executives
Local education authorities in England
Billing authorities in England
Local authorities in Leicestershire